Prince Mikhail Dmitrievich Gorchakov (– , Warsaw) was a Russian General of the Artillery from the Gorchakov family, who commanded the Russian forces in the latter stages of the Crimean War and later served as a Namestnik of Kingdom of Poland from 1856 until his death.

Life and career
Mikhail and his brother Pyotr Gorchakov were the children of a notable writer Prince Dmitri Petrovich Gorchakov and his wife Natalie Boborykina. Mikhail entered the Russian army in 1807 as a cadet of the Leub Guard Artillery battalion. In 1809 in the rank of lieutenant he took part in the campaigns against Persia.

During the Napoleonic Wars he distinguished himself at Borodino (received the Order of St. Vladimir of 4th degree) and at Bautzen (received the Order of St. Anna of 2nd degree, the Prussian Order Pour le Mérite and the rank of staff-captain). His career quickly developed and in 1824 he was a Major General. Gorchakov demonstrated bravery during the Russo-Turkish War of 1828–1829, on 29 May 1829 he was one of the first to swim across the Danube. He was present at the sieges of Silistria and Shumna.

After being appointed, on 6 December 1829 a general officer, after 7 February 1831 Gorchakov replaced wounded General Ivan Sukhozanet as the head of the artillery of the Acting Army. Later he was present in the campaign in Poland, and was wounded at the Battle of Olszynka Grochowska, on February 25, 1831. He also distinguished himself at the Battle of Ostrołęka and at the taking of Warsaw.

During the next years he served under Field Marshal Paskevich as the head of the Staff of the Acting Army. For these services he was promoted to the rank of lieutenant-general and numerous supreme Russian and foreign awards.

In 1846 he was nominated military governor of Warsaw. In 1849 he commanded the Russian artillery in the war against the Hungarians, and in 1852 he visited London as a representative of the Russian army at the funeral of the duke of Wellington. At this time he was chief of the staff of the Russian army and adjutant general to the tsar.

Upon Russia declaring war against Turkey in 1853, he was appointed commander-in-chief of the troops which occupied Moldavia and Wallachia. In 1854 he crossed the Danube and besieged Silistra, but was superseded in April by Prince Ivan Paskevich, who, however, resigned on June 8, when Gorchakov resumed the command. In July the siege of Silistra was aborted due to Austrian diplomatic pressure, and the Russian armies recrossed the Danube; in August they withdrew to Russia.

In 1855 Gorchakov was appointed commander-in-chief of the Russian forces in the Crimea in place of the disgraced Prince Menshikov. Gorchakov's defence of Sevastopol, and final retreat to the northern part of the town, which he continued to defend till peace was signed in Paris, were conducted with skill and energy. In 1856 he was appointed namestnik of Kingdom of Poland in succession to Prince Paskevich. He died at Warsaw on May 30, 1861, and was buried, in accordance with his own wish, at Sevastopol.

References

 

1792 births
1861 deaths
Mikhail Dmitrievich
Imperial Russian Army generals
Members of the State Council (Russian Empire)
Recipients of the Order of St. George of the Third Degree
Russian people of the November Uprising
Recipients of the Order of St. Vladimir, 4th class
Recipients of the Order of St. Anna, 2nd class
Recipients of the Pour le Mérite (military class)
Russian military personnel of the Crimean War
Russian military personnel of the Napoleonic Wars
Namestniks of the Kingdom of Poland